The Colombo Philharmonic Choir is one of the oldest active Sri Lankan classical choirs, and the oldest in Colombo. The choir consists of around 25 committed singers.

History
The Colombo Philharmonic traces its origins to the merger of two church choirs- those of the Maradana and Kollupitiya Methodist Churches. In August 1955, members of the two choirs met and decided to form "a properly constituted choral group", conducted by geologist Dr Gerald Cooray.

References

Sri Lankan choirs
Sri Lankan musicians
Musical groups established in 1955
1955 establishments in Ceylon